Michael Court (born 3 February 1941) is a South African cricketer. He played in seven first-class matches for Eastern Province from 1964/65 to 1966/67.

See also
 List of Eastern Province representative cricketers

References

External links
 

1941 births
Living people
South African cricketers
Eastern Province cricketers